Eran James (born 27 March 1989) is a singer-songwriter from Melbourne. He has released two studio albums that have reached the ARIA top 100.

Music career
James first performed as an eight-year-old. He signed his first record deal as a thirteen-year-old with Universal Music Group. He released his first album, Reviewing The Situation, aged fifteen in 2004. The album included his debut single, a distinctive soul-funk cover of the KC & The Sunshine Band song "I Get Lifted".

Following the successful release of his first album, James attracted the attention of some of the world's leading producers. Moving to New York, he teamed with producer Jay Newland, who co-produced the Norah Jones album Come Away with Me. Working with Newland, James produced his second album, Ten Songs About Love, released on 6 October 2007. It reached No. 43 on the ARIA charts.

James was spotted by Elton John after playing as the opening act on his 2007 Australian Tour. Elton invited Eran to the UK in 2008 and helped him with songwriting and mentoring.

In 2010, through Elton John, Eran was introduced to Grammy Award-winning producer and musician Robin Millar. They began collaborating and writing music, becoming close friends who continue to work together.

James moved back to Melbourne in 2011 and continue playing his music to audiences across Australia. In December 2011 he was the opening act on Elton John's Australian tour.

In December 2011, James released an EP titled, Down the Road.

Discography

Albums

Extended plays

Singles

References

External links
 Official website

1989 births
Living people
Australian singer-songwriters
Singers from Melbourne
21st-century Australian singers
21st-century Australian male singers
Australian male singer-songwriters